Colimes Canton is a canton of Ecuador, located in the Guayas Province.  Its capital is the town of Colimes.  Its population at the 2001 census was 21,049.

Demographics
Ethnic groups as of the Ecuadorian census of 2010:
Montubio  46.2%
Mestizo  44.3%
Afro-Ecuadorian  5.6%
White  3.8%
Indigenous  0.1%
Other  0.1%

References

Cantons of Guayas Province